Terence Moore is an American sports journalist based in Atlanta. He has appeared on national and local television, including The Oprah Winfrey Show, CNN, and various ESPN shows, most prominently "Outside The Line." He was a frequent guest on ESPN's Jim Rome Is Burning

Moore also appeared on "The Ed Show" among other MSNBC entities, and he is part of various episodes of the NFL Network's Top Ten list. In addition, he has a regular segment every Sunday night on the highly rated "Sports Zone" show, which appears on Atlanta's WSB-TV (Channel 2), the most-watched ABC affiliate in the country. As for the Internet, Moore is a national columnist for Sports on Earth.com, and he writes weekly baseball columns for MLB.com and occasional columns for CNN.com.

Moore worked for The Atlanta Journal-Constitution (AJC) for nearly 25 years, where he was a sports columnist, from December 1984 through April 2009, when he took a voluntary buyout.  He has covered more than 25 Super Bowls, numerous World Series, Olympic Games, NBA Finals, Final Fours, Indianapolis 500s, championship fights, major golf tournaments and other sporting events.
 
Prior to joining the AJC, he spent five years at The San Francisco Examiner, where he covered the San Francisco Giants, Oakland Raiders, the San Francisco 49ers and wrote columns during his last two years at the paper. Prior to going to San Francisco, Moore spent three years at The Cincinnati Enquirer, where he covered Indiana University and Purdue University sports, the Cincinnati Reds and Xavier University basketball.

Among the many awards Moore has received, he was honored  in 1999 by the National Association of Black Journalists for ranking as the longest-running African-American sports columnist in the history of major newspapers. He was the first full-time black sports reporter for both The Cincinnati Enquirer and The San Francisco Examiner.
 
Moore was born in South Bend, Ind., but courtesy of his father who was transferred several times across the Midwest as an AT&T supervisor, Moore went to high school in Cincinnati and in Chicago before he finished his prep days in Milwaukee, where he starred in baseball and football and became news editor of the high school newspaper.

Moore later majored in Economics at Miami University in Oxford, Ohio, where he graduated in 1978 with a bachelor's degree in business. He was on the staff at what is the oldest college newspaper in the United States for four years, the last year as sports editor.
 
After leaving The Atlanta Journal-Constitution, Moore became a national sports columnist for AOL FanHouse for two years before he formed Moore Sports Inc., which allows him to work for various media entities. Moore also has been a visiting professor of journalism at Miami (Ohio) University since 2014. He teaches a course each fall semester called "Sports Reporting in a Digital Age," and he gives occasional lectures during the spring semester.

References

External links
 http://www.sportsonearth.com/writer/terence_moore
 http://mlb.mlb.com/news/columnists/?id=terence_moore

American sportswriters
Living people
Miami University alumni
The Cincinnati Enquirer people
Year of birth missing (living people)